The Georgia Multi-Modal Passenger Terminal (MMPT) is a planned passenger terminal, designed by FXFOWLE Architects and Cooper Carry, to be built in a location to be determined near the Five Points MARTA rail station in The Gulch area of Downtown Atlanta. It would be the hub of existing and proposed transportation networks, including the existing MARTA rail and bus systems, the Xpress GA and other regional express buses, and the planned commuter rail system.

In July 2012, redevelopment plans for The Gulch moved ahead when President Barack Obama announced the final selection of the MMPT as one of a small group of projects from across the country to participate in the Dashboard initiative, putting the permitting process for the Terminal on the fast track, cutting the timeline by as much as one year.

In May 2013, Norfolk Southern Railway, one of three Class 1 railroads which could serve or switch this proposed terminal, stated that it would be unable to operate both freight and passenger trains into/from/by the proposed facility. If accurate, possibly directed service to/from the site may be ordered by the U.S. Surface Transportation Board.

As of 2019, the station is listed as a major stop on the Southeast High Speed Rail Corridor, with service north to Charlotte, North Carolina, south to Macon, and points beyond.

References

External links
 FXFOWLE - Georgia Multi-Modal Passenger Terminal

Railway stations in Georgia (U.S. state)
Rapid transit stations in Georgia (U.S. state)
Metropolitan Atlanta Rapid Transit Authority stations